Bermuda competed at the 2014 Summer Youth Olympics, in Nanjing, China from 16 August to 28 August 2014.

Athletics

Bermuda qualified three athletes.

Qualification Legend: Q=Final A (medal); qB=Final B (non-medal); qC=Final C (non-medal); qD=Final D (non-medal); qE=Final E (non-medal)

Boys
Track & road events

Field Events

Girls
Track & road events

Sailing

Bermuda qualified one boat based on its performance at the 2013 World Byte CII Championships.

Swimming

Bermuda qualified one swimmer.

Boys

Triathlon

Bermuda was given two quotas to compete by the tripartite committee.

Individual

Relay

See also
Bermuda at the 2014 Commonwealth Games
Bermuda at the 2014 Winter Olympics

References

2014 in Bermudian sport
Nations at the 2014 Summer Youth Olympics
Bermuda at the Youth Olympics